Six Days of War: June 1967 and the Making of the Modern Middle East is a 2002 non-fiction book by American-born Israeli historian and Israeli ambassador to the United States, Michael Oren, chronicling the events of the Six-Day War fought between Israel and its Arab neighbors. Widely praised by critics, the book won the Los Angeles Times Book Prize for history and spent seven weeks on the New York Times Best Seller list.

While researching the book, Oren utilized primary sources from Israel, the Arab world, the United States, the United Kingdom and the former Soviet Union, much of which had only recently become available to scholars. Citing the breadth and depth of Oren's research and the lucidity of his writing, several reviews, including those of National Public Radio, Washington Post Book World, the Philadelphia Inquirer, and the Chicago Sun-Times, described the book as the definitive account of the conflict.

A Hebrew translation of Six Days of War was made available in June 2007.

Causes of the war

Oren emphasizes that war was intended by neither side, rather, as with the July Crisis starting World War I, war resulted from an escalating series of events, some of them purely accidental. For example, in November 1966 three Israeli policemen were killed when they drove over a mine presumed to have been left by Palestinian fedayeen operating from Jordan (though likely sponsored by Syria). For unclear reasons, the usually efficient U.S. Ambassador to Israel Walworth Barbour allowed several days to pass before transmitting a condolence message from Jordan's King Hussein to Israeli Prime Minister Levi Eshkol. In the absence of a condolence message Israel retaliated, reasoning that although the Jordanian state was not behind the attack, the people of Jordan had offered shelter to the attackers — this became one of the series of episodes that led to  war. Another example was the decision of the Israelis to refrain from parading armour in their 1967 Independence Day parade in Jerusalem: although this was designed to lessen tension as Jerusalem was divided by the 1949 armistice, it was actually interpreted as a sign that the Israelis were concentrating their armour for an invasion of Syria.

Why Israel Won
Arab leaders and commanders were locked in a battle with one another to prove their militancy and outdo each other in their hatred of Israel: in the case of the Ba'athist leadership of Syria, Oren argues that war was central to their ideology, while for the Egyptians bellicose rhetoric over Israel was an attempt to gain pan-Arab leadership — even though Egypt did not want a war. Inside Egypt the leadership was dangerously split, with different factions using anti-Israeli rhetoric as a way of faction fighting inside the regime. As a result, there was no effective way for the Arabs as a whole to use their numerical superiority in a multi-front war while the armed forces of the largest Arab state were caught between confusing orders and strategies. The Israelis worked hard, planning meticulously for the possibility of war with an army that drilled diligently. By contrast, one Syrian general predicted total defeat of Israel in four days "at most." President Gamal Abdel Nasser of Egypt insisted that the Israeli Air Force was incapable of attacking Egyptian Air Force bases — in fact the successful Israeli attack on Egyptian air fields was a key factor in Israel's victory. One Egyptian official described his country's leadership as believing that "the destruction of Israel was a child's game that only required the hooking up of a few telephone lines at the commander's house and the writing of victory slogans."

Reception

The book was widely praised by critics and won the Los Angeles Times Book Prize for History. It spent seven weeks on the New York Times bestseller list. The New York Times Book Review wrote positively of Six Days of War, as did the Washington Post which calls it "not only the best book so far written on the Six Day War, it is likely to remain the best."  Positive reviews have been published by the Atlantic Monthly, the New Republic, The Guardian, Newsweek International, The Economist, and by noted historian John Keegan and noted Israeli New Historian Benny Morris.

Norman Finkelstein wrote a critical review, calling Six Days of War an "apologetic narrative" in which Oren "basically reiterates the official Israeli version of the June war."

Awards 

 National Jewish Book Awards for Jewish Book of the Year in 2002-2003

References

External links
Presentation by Oren on Six Days of War, June 17, 2002, C-SPAN
Booknotes interview with Oren on Six Days of War, August 25, 2002, C-SPAN 
Interview with Oren on Six Days of War, April 7, 2003, C-SPAN 
Presentation by Oren on Six Days of War, June 21, 2003, C-SPAN 

2002 non-fiction books
21st-century history books
Books about the Arab–Israeli conflict
History books about the Six-Day War
Books about Jerusalem